Longnan is a prefecture-level city in the southeast of Gansu province in China. It borders Sichuan on its south and Shaanxi on its east. As of the 2020 Chinese census, the population of the prefecture-level city was 2,855,555.

Geography and climate
Longnan is in southern Gansu province bordering Shaanxi in the east and Sichuan in the south. It is called Gansu's southern gateway and gateway to the northwest. The major geographic features in Longnan are the Qinba Mountains in the east, the Loess Plateau in the north, and the Tibetan Plateau in the west. It is part of the Central Han basin in the east and the Sichuan basin in the south. The three major rivers in Longnan are the Bailong, the Baishui, and the Jialing. Besides these major rivers there are more than 3800 streams and creeks. The annual flow from all of these rivers and streams is more than 28 billion m3.

Longnan has a temperate, monsoon-influenced semi-arid climate (Köppen BSk/BSh, depending on the source definition), with cool and very dry winters and hot, moderately humid summers. With monthly percent possible sunshine ranging from 34% in September and October to 53% in December, the city receives 1,850 sunlight hours annually. Two-thirds of the annual rainfall occurs from June to September.

History
Longnan was settled by humans at least 7000 years ago. Between 5000 and 6000 years ago, civilizations developed along the Xihan ("Western Han") and Bailong ("White Dragon") rivers. Anping in Wudu as well as Lixian both have ancient ruins. Longnan is very important in Chinese history: it was the home of Rong tribes that troubled the Shang and Zhou dynasties and is considered the homeland of the House of Ying, the family of the Qin dynasty that united China at the end of the Warring States period. Wudu County was even founded as part of the Qin Empire. It is still common to find Qin artifactsincluding pottery, bronzes, and coinsin the area.

During the Sixteen Kingdoms period, the region was ruled by the Qiang kingdoms of Later Qin and Tanchang, the latter has its capital in present-day Tanchang. Tanchang is conquered by Emperor Wu of Northern Zhou in 564. The region then went under control of Sui, Tang and Song dynasties, then subsequently conquered by the Tibetans, Tanguts, Jurchens and Mongols before finally administered by Ming dynasty court.

Administration
Longnan has 1 urban districts, 8 counties, 242 towns, and 3243 villages with a total population of 2567718.

Economy
In 2004, Longnan's GDP was 6,338,000,000 RMB, a 12% growth over the previous year.

Important agricultural products include cereals and grains, Chinese medicinal herbs, vegetable oil, fruits, nuts, berries, and vegetables. Coal, copper, lead, zinc, petroleum, and gold are all major mineral resources for Longnan. Cement and other building materials are also produced here.

Transportation
 Longnan Chengxian Airport
 China National Highway 212
 G75 Lanzhou–Haikou Expressway
 Chongqing–Lanzhou railway
Baoji–Chengdu railway (stations only available in Hui County and Liangdang County)
Tianshui–Longnan railway (under construction)

Notable people
 Cai Wu, Chinese politician and former Minister of Culture of the People's Republic of China.
 Cao Dong, Chinese footballer (Chongqing Dangdai Lifan, Chinese Super League)
 Chen Hongjun, Major of People's Liberation Army who was killed in combat during the 2020–2022 China–India skirmishes in the Sino-Indian border
 Li Xi, Chinese politician
 Yang Fulin, Chinese military officer and politician
 Zhang Zhixi, Chinese actress (Lady Zhen in The Advisor's Alliance)

Flora and fauna
Longnan has more than 1300 species of trees and shrubs, 1300 plants and herbs used for Chinese medicine, 100 wild fruits and berries, and 300 species of animals, many species of which are protected.

Notes

External links
Official Website 

 
Prefecture-level divisions of Gansu